Hermeneutics is the theory and methodology of interpretation. The tradition of Western hermeneutics starts in the writings of Aristotle and continues to the modern era.

Mesopotamian hermeneutics

Aristotle and Plato 
In De Interpretatione, Aristotle offers a theory which lays the groundwork for many later theories of interpretation and semiotics:

Equally important to later developments are some ancient texts on poetry, rhetoric, and sophistry:
 Aristotle's Poetics, Rhetoric, and On Sophistical Refutations
 Plato's dialogues, Cratylus, Ion, Gorgias, Lesser Hippias, and The Republic
However, these texts deal with the presentation and refutation of arguments, speeches, and poems rather than with the understanding of texts per se. As Ramberg and Gjesdal note, "Only with the Stoics, and their reflections on the interpretation of myth, do we encounter something like a methodological awareness of the problems of textual understanding."

In The Republic, Socrates denies poets entry into his "just city set up in speech" until they can prove their value. In Ion, Plato famously portrays poets as possessed. Poetry thus becomes open to ridicule. Whatever hints of truth it may have, this truth is covered up by madness. However, another line of thinking arose with Theagenes of Rhegium, who suggested that, instead of taking poetry literally, it ought to be taken as allegories of nature. Stoic philosophers further developed this idea, reading into poetry both allegories of nature and allegories of ethical behavior.

 

Aristotle differed with his teacher, Plato, about the worth of poetry. Both saw art as an act of mimesis, but where Plato at times saw a pale, essentially false imitation of reality, Aristotle saw the possibility of truth in imitation. As critic David Richter points out, "For Aristotle, artists must disregard incidental facts to search for deeper universal truths." Thus, instead of being essentially false, poetry may be universally true.

Apostolic Fathers 
The principle of prophecy fulfillment was carried over from the Apostolic Age and was continued up to the beginning of the 3rd century A.D. For example, Irenaeus dedicates an entire chapter of Against Heresies to the defense of Isaiah 7:14, which was one of the chief prophecies used to validate Jesus as the Messiah.

Even more than Irenaeus, the second century apologists tended to interpret and utilize most scripture as if it were primarily for the purpose of showing prophecy fulfillment. Prominent among these was Justin Martyr, who made extensive use of scripture to this end. Examples of prophecy fulfillment can be seen in his Apology, in which chapters 31–53 are specifically dedicated to proving through prophecy that Jesus was the Messiah. He uses scripture similarly in Dialogue with Trypho.

Here Justin demonstrates that prophecy fulfillment supersedes logical context in hermeneutics.

It is likely that the preeminence of prophecy fulfillment was a product of the circumstances of the early church. The primary intent of early authors was a defense of Christianity against attacks from paganism and Judaism, as well as suppressing what were considered to be schismatic or heretical groups. To this end, Martin Jan Mulder suggested that prophecy fulfillment was the primary hermeneutical method because Roman society placed a high value upon both antiquity and oracles. By using the Old Testament (a term linked with supersessionism) to validate Jesus, early Christians sought to tap into both the antiquity of the Jewish scriptures and the oracles of the prophets.

Late antiquity 
Two divergent schools of thought emerged during this period, which extends from 200 A.D. to the medieval period. Historians divide this period into the Ante-Nicene Period and the First seven Ecumenical Councils.

Ante-Nicene period 
The Ante-Nicene Period (literally meaning "before Nicaea") of the history of early Christianity extended from the late 1st century to the early 4th century. Its end was marked by the First Council of Nicaea in 325 A.D. Christianity during this time was extremely diverse, with many developments that are difficult to trace and follow. There is also a relative paucity of available material, and this period is less studied than the preceding Apostolic Age and the historical ages following it. Nevertheless, this part of Christian history is important because it had a significant effect upon the development of Christianity.

First seven ecumenical councils 
This era begins with the First Council of Nicaea, which enunciated the Nicene Creed that, in its original form and as modified by the First Council of Constantinople of 381 A.D., was seen as the touchstone of orthodoxy for the doctrine of the Trinity.

The first seven Ecumenical Councils, from the First Council of Nicaea (325 A.D. ) to the Second Council of Nicaea (787 A.D. ), represent an attempt to reach an orthodox consensus and to establish a unified Christendom.

The first scholar to study this time period as a whole was Philip Schaff, who wrote The Seven Ecumenical Councils of the Undivided Church, first published after his death in 1901. The topic is of particular interest to proponents of paleo-orthodoxy, who seek to recover the church as it was before the schisms.

Schools of Alexandria and Antioch 
As early as the third century, Christian hermeneutics began to split into two primary schools: the Alexandrian and the Antiochene.

The Alexandrian biblical interpretations stressed allegorical readings, often  at the expense of the texts' literal meaning. Origen and Clement of Alexandria were two major scholars in this school.

The Antiochene school stressed the literal and historical meaning of texts. Theodore of Mopsuestia and Diodore of Tarsus were the primary figures in this school.

Medieval period 
Medieval Christian biblical interpretations of text incorporated exegesis into a fourfold mode which emphasized the distinction between the letter and the spirit of the text. This schema was based on the various ways of interpreting text that were utilized by the patristic writers.
 The literal sense (sensus historicus) of scripture denotes what the text states or reports directly.
 The allegorical sense (sensus allegoricus) explains text in the light of the doctrinal content of church dogma, so that each literal element has a symbolic meaning (see also Typology (theology)).
 The moral application of a text to the individual reader or hearer is the third sense (the sensus tropologicus or sensus moralis).
 The fourth sense (sensus anagogicus) draws out of the text the implicit allusions it contains to secret metaphysical and eschatological knowledge, called gnosis.
Biblical hermeneutics in the Middle Ages witnessed the proliferation of nonliteral interpretations of the Bible. Christian commentators could read Old Testament narratives simultaneously:
 as prefigurations of analogous New Testament episodes,
 as symbolic lessons about church institutions and current teachings,
 and as personally applicable allegories of the Spirit.
In each case, the meaning of the narrative was constrained by imputing a particular intention to the Bible, such as teaching morality. But these interpretive bases were posited by the religious tradition rather than suggested by a preliminary reading of the text.

A similar fourfold mode is found in rabbinic writings. The four categories are:
 Peshat (simple interpretation)
 Remez (allusion)
 Derash (interpretive)
 Sod (secret or mystical)
It is uncertain whether the rabbinic categories of interpretation predate those of the patristic version. The medieval period saw the growth of many new categories of rabbinic interpretation and of exegesis of the Torah. Among these were the emergence of Kabbalah and the writings of Maimonides.

The customary medieval exegetical technique commented on the text in glossae or annotations that were written between the lines or at the side of the text (which was left with wide margins for this purpose). The text might be further commented on in scholia, which are long, exegetical passages, often on a separate page.

References 

Hermeneutics
Hermeneutics